Megasurcula cryptoconoides is an extinct species of sea snail, a marine gastropod mollusk in the family Pseudomelatomidae, the turrids and allies.

Distribution
Fossils of this marine species have been found in Late Miocene strata in the Otokawa Formation, Japan.

References

Makiyam, J. 1926. Tertiary Fossils from North Kankyo-do, Korea. Memoirs of the College of Science, Kyoto Imperial University, ser. B, Vol. II, No. 3, pp. 143–160, pls. XI-XIII.

External links
 The Tohoku University Museum: Megasurcula cryptoconoides

cryptoconoides
Gastropods described in 1926